Alexander Macfarlane (1851–1913) was a Scottish logician, physicist, and mathematician.

Alexander Macfarlane may also refer to:

 Alexander MacFarlane (astronomer) (1702–1755), Scottish astronomer, merchant, politician and planter
 Alexander Macfarlane (politician) (1818–1898), Canadian lawyer and politician
 Alex MacFarlane, Australian activist
 Sandy MacFarlane (1878–1945), Scottish football player and manager